SeeU is a female Korean vocal created for the Vocaloid 3 software by SBS A&T (formerly SBS Artech) and was the only Korean vocal released for that version of the software. As well as a Korean vocal, she possessed a Japanese vocal. The voice behind her is Dahee Kim from the band GLAM.

Development
On June 6, 2011, a demo called I=Fantasy that was produced by Bang Shi Hyuk (a.k.a. Hitman Bang), was introduced during the VOCALOID3 announcement. On August 30, her name and appearance was revealed. Pre-orders for SeeU took place on October 14, 2011, and a community called CreCrew was opened. She was released on the 21st of the same month, the same day that Vocaloid 3 itself was released, making her one of the first 4 products released for the engine alongside V3 Megpoid, VY1v3 and Mew. In Japan, SeeU was released on December 16, 2011. Sales of her software in Japan ended on March 1, 2013.

During an interview with SBS A&T manager, Hyo Eun Kim, it was said that SeeU's name came to mind after thinking of a line from the 2009 film, Avatar. The line "I See You" popped into her mind and became the inspiration for 'SeeU'. According to SBS, this is only one of several meanings of her name.

Additional Software
During the Vocaloid 3 promotions, it was claimed that SeeU had enough capabilities to do English. While post release discoveries noted she had extra phonemes recorded for use to create English with her Korean vocal, this was still not a true English vocal recreation and SBS artech received criticism over this. SBS Artech announced they would produce an English vocal for SeeU. In Feb 2012 they stated that they were working on a full English voicebank In August 2012, SBS reported that the recordings for the voicebank had been completed and was now going through a tuning process. Her English VB will be similar to the "Append" expansion pack of Vocaloid 2 and her design slightly adjusted.  
On February 4, 2013, in response to a Korean fan's question about the progress of English Voicebank, SBS posted a reply that the development of English Voicebank is on hold. Reasons for this are currently unknown.

An official male version of the character of SeeU, called "ZeeU", was unveiled. It was mentioned that they may discuss giving him a vocal, but no further news has been heard since.

Characteristics
Her cat ears are speakers. According to her illustrator, they are actually detachable Her neckband is a CD player. Soundwaves light up on the rectangle of her flat-shoes and on the upper part of her top (chest). There is a pause button at the back of her clothes, a power button on the ribbon of her neckband and an "on" button on one of the buttons at the front of her top. During a virtual interview starring SeeU conducted by SBS, SeeU revealed her clothing size to be XXS.

See also
 List of Vocaloid products

Notes

References

Vocaloids introduced in 2011
Fictional singers
Seoul Broadcasting System